A Long Story Eliane Elias is sixth studio album by Brazilian jazz artist Eliane Elias. The record was released in 1991 via Manhattan Records label.

Reception
Scott Yanow of Allmusic gave this album a negative review, stating "Eliane Elias is a very talented acoustic pianist whose style at times hints at Herbie Hancock and Chick Corea, but sounds quite individual. Unfortunately, this set is extremely lightweight. Most numbers have Elias doubling on synthesizers, with over half of the selections also including her wordless vocals; her voice is average at best. The tunes are moderately pop-ish without being memorable and Elias' piano playing is secondary to the weak melodies (all but "Let Me Go" are her originals) and so-so grooves. Eliane Elias is capable of so much better. Fortunately, there are many better Elias recordings available than this misfire."

Track listing

Personnel
Eliane Elias - piano, synthesizer, vocals (tracks 1-7, 10), arrangements
Anthony Jackson (tracks: 5), Jeff Andrews (tracks: 6, 9), Lincoln Goines (tracks: 2, 4, 7), Marc Johnson (2) (tracks: 1, 3, 8) - bass
Dave Weckl (tracks: 4, 7), Peter Erskine (tracks: 1 to 3, 5, 6, 8, 9) - drums
Executive Producer – Christine Martin
Jon Herington (tracks: 1 to 3, 5, 6, 8) - guitar
Mino Cinelu (tracks: 1 to 3, 5, 6, 8, 9) - percussion
Producer – Eliane Elias, Jim Beard
Othello Molineaux (tracks: 9) - steel drums
Bob Berg (tracks: 6, 7, 9) - tenor saxophone
Mark Ledford (tracks: 1, 4, 6, 7) - vocals

References

External links

1991 albums
Eliane Elias albums